Christ on the Cross is a 1782 oil-on-canvas painting by the French Neoclassical artist Jacques-Louis David. It was commissioned by marshal Louis de Noailles and his wife Catherine de Cossé-Brissac for their family chapel in the église des Capucins in Paris. One of David's few religious works, it is now in the église Saint-Vincent in Mâcon.

Bibliography
Antoine Schnapper (ed.) and Arlette Sérullaz, Jacques-Louis David 1748–1825: catalogue de l'exposition rétrospective Louvre-Versailles 1989-1990, Paris, Réunion des Musées nationaux, 1989
Sophie Monneret, David et le néoclassicisme, Paris, Terrail, 1998
Simon Lee, David, Paris, Phaidon, 2002

1782 paintings
Paintings by Jacques-Louis David
David